Xavier Malisse was the defending champion, but chose to compete in ATP 250: Los Angeles instead.
Tobias Kamke defeated Milos Raonic 6–3, 7–6(4) in the final.

Seeds

Draw

Finals

Top half

Bottom half

References
Main Draw
Qualifying Singles

Challenger Banque Nationale de Granby
Challenger de Granby